Berengar of Passau (* in Passau, 14 July 1045 in Passau) was the Bishop of Passau from 1013 to 1045.

Berengar was the son of a wealthy citizen and probably one of the few Bishops of Passau born in Passau. During Berengar's reign, the Hungarian Queen Gisela came to Passau to enter the Benedictine nunnery of Niedernburg, where she soon became an abbess. On the Ascension of the Ascension of the Year 1045, Emperor Henry III. As a guest of Bishop Berengars in Passau, he maintained close relations with the later Abbot Gotthard of Niederaltaich and the famous hermit Gunther.

References

Year of birth unknown
11th-century bishops in Bavaria
Roman Catholic bishops of Passau